Fernström is a Swedish surname that may refer to
Bengt-Göran Fernström (born 1941), Swedish sprinter
Eric K. Fernström (1901–1995), Swedish ship owner and businessman
Fernström Prize 
Felix Fernström (1916–1991), Swedish bobsledder
Helena Fernström (born 1969), Swedish sprinter, daughter of Bengt-Göran
John Fernström (1897–1961), Swedish composer
Kathlene Fernström (born 1986), Swedish association football player
Linus Fernström (born 1987), Swedish ice hockey goaltender
Madelyn Fernstrom, American physician, scientist and journalist
Maria Fernström (1967–2002), Swedish sprinter, daughter of Bengt-Göran